Asadul Haq Khasru is a Jatiya Party (Ershad) politician and the former Member of Parliament of Narsingdi-5.

Career
Khasru was elected to parliament from Narsingdi-5 as a Jatiya Party candidate in 1986.

References

Jatiya Party politicians
Living people
3rd Jatiya Sangsad members
4th Jatiya Sangsad members
Year of birth missing (living people)